"Little Poll Parrot" is an English language nursery rhyme. It has a Roud Folk Song Index number of 20178.

Lyrics
Like Little Miss Muffet and Little Jack Horner the verse is an example of a nursery rhyme that contains six dactylic lines. The most common modern version of the lyrics is:

Little Poll Parrot
Sat in his garret
Eating toast and tea;
A little brown mouse
Jumped into the house,
And stole it all away.

Origins
It has been argued that the rhyme originates in the seventeenth century. The earliest printed version was in a collection by James Orchard Halliwell in the 1840s.

Notes

English folk songs
English nursery rhymes
English children's songs
Traditional children's songs
Songs about birds
Fictional parrots
Songs about mice and rats
Songwriter unknown
Year of song unknown